Pinus luzmariae is a species of conifer in the family Pinaceae. It is found in Honduras and southwest Mexico. It forms hybrids with Pinus herrerae which display hybrid vigor. Both species are placed in Pinus subsect. Australes.

References

luzmariae
Trees of Mexico
Trees of Honduras
Least concern plants
Taxonomy articles created by Polbot
Flora of the Sierra Madre Occidental